Yang Jing-se, Lieutenant General of the Air Force of Taiwan. On February 23, 2022, he succeeded his predecessor, Luo De-min, and was appointed as the Director of Military Intelligence Bureau. Served from March 1.

Air force experience 
Yang Jingse was admitted to the Air Force Academy in his early years. In 1996, France sold 60 Mirage 2000s to Taiwan. Shen Yiming led the team to Dijon Air Force Base in France. Yang Jingse was one of the first 8 Taiwanese pilots to go to secret training. Pilot training in the French military ends on 1 May 1997.

During the years of Ma Ying-jeou's administration, the Mirage fighter crashed in a routine training exercise in 2013. Yang Jingse was in charge of the maintenance as the political and warfare director of the 499th Tactical Fighter Wing of the Air Force. He initially judged that it was a system failure.

In August 2020, Yang Jingse took over as the Undersecretary of Intelligence of the Staff Headquarters of the Ministry of National Defense, and was promoted to Lieutenant General of the Air Force in December.

On February 23, 2022, the General Staff Headquarters announced that Yang Jingse replaced Luo Min as Director of the Military Intelligence Bureau, and took office on March 1.

See also

Ref 

Living people
Year of birth missing (living people)
Directors of intelligence agencies
Military Intelligence Bureau
Republic of China Air Force personnel
21st-century Taiwanese people